The 2010 Arizona gubernatorial election was held on November 2, 2010, to elect the Governor of Arizona. Incumbent Republican Jan Brewer ran for a full term. Party primaries were held on August 24, 2010. Jan Brewer won a full term, defeating Arizona Attorney General and Democratic nominee Terry Goddard 54% to 42%.

Background
Democratic Governor Janet Napolitano was term limited and nominated to become Secretary of Homeland Security by President-elect Barack Obama, and was confirmed by the United States Senate on January 20, 2009, resigning as governor the same day. Since Arizona does not have a lieutenant governor, Republican Secretary of State Jan Brewer was first in the state's gubernatorial line of succession and was sworn in as governor upon Napolitano's resignation. Brewer announced on November 5, 2009, that she would seek a full term in 2010.

Democratic primary

Candidates

Declared
 Terry Goddard, State Attorney General, former mayor of Phoenix, and nominee for governor in 1990

Declined
 Neil Giuliano, former mayor of Tempe
 Phil Gordon, Mayor of Phoenix

Republican primary
The primary to select the 2010 Republican nominee for governor of Arizona was held on August 24, 2010.

Candidates

Declared
 Jan Brewer, incumbent governor

Withdrew
 Dean Martin, Arizona State Treasurer (dropped out on July 9, 2010, and endorsed Brewer)
 Owen Mills, member of the National Rifle Association Board of Directors (dropped out on July 13, 2010)

Declined
 Joe Arpaio, Maricopa County Sheriff
 J.D. Hayworth, former U.S. Representative
 John Munger, former chair of the Arizona Republican Party
 Vernon Parker, Mayor of Paradise Valley (ran for Congress)
 Fife Symington, former Governor of Arizona

Polling

* Dropped out of race after entering to seek the nomination

Results

* Dropped out prior to primary, but still appeared on ballot

Libertarian primary

Candidates
 Ronald Cavanaugh
 Barry Hess
 Bruce Olsen
 Alvin Ray Yount

Results

General election

Candidates
 Jan Brewer (R), incumbent governor
 Terry Goddard (D), attorney general
 Barry Hess (L)
 Larry Gist (G)

Predictions

Polling

Debate
On September 1, the first and only debate was held between all four candidates and moderated by Ted Simons. The debate drew national attention after Jan Brewer "stumbled and stammered" through her opening statements. Before the debate the governor had made several comments about there being beheadings in the desert. During the debate Terry Goddard tried to get the governor to admit that it was a false statement. Goddard said quote  Jan I'm going to give you an opportunity to admit that was a false statement  but of course the governor Steered clear of the question. After the debate reporters were demanding answers, and still she would just not answer the question. After the debate, Brewer stated that she would do no more debates.

Results

References

External links
 Elections at the Arizona Secretary of State
 Arizona Governor Candidates at Project Vote Smart
 Arizona Governor 2010 from OurCampaigns.com
 2010 Arizona Governor General Election: Jan Brewer (R) vs Terry Goddard (D) graph of multiple polls from Pollster.com Election 2010: Arizona Governor from Rasmussen Reports 2010 Arizona Governor Race from Real Clear Politics 2010 Arizona Governor's Race from CQ Politics Campaign contributions for 2010 Arizona Governor from Follow the Money Race Profile in The New York TimesDebates
 Arizona Governor Debate, C-SPAN'', September 1, 2010, full video (58:00)
Official campaign sites
 Jan Brewer for Governor 
 Terry Goddard for Governor 

Gubernatorial
2010
2010 United States gubernatorial elections